The Only Mom is a 2019 Burmese horror film starring Nine Nine, Wutt Hmone Shwe Yi, Daung and Pyae Pyae. The film produced by Brave Impire Film Production premiered in Myanmar on February 8, 2019 and became one of the highest-grossing Burmese films of the year. This film is exhibited in Myanmar, Singapore, Thailand, Vietnam, and other countries.The movie earned Hundreds of thousands100,00 an within nine days of its release.

Synopsis
A family of three moved to a colonial-style mansion in Yenangyaung. The house has some unique ancient photographs. From the day she got home, the daughter of the couple, who had not listened to her words, became diligent and began to behave strangely. This girl sleeps all day and wakes up at night. Why is this girl so weird? As a mother, how can she deal with such issues? It's exciting to see how these events relate to the afterlife.

Cast
 Nine Nine as Ko Aung, father of Thiri
 Wutt Mhone Shwe Yi as May Hnin, mother of Thiri
 Daung as the photographer
 Pyae Pyae (child actress) as Thiri
 Ton Ton (child actress) as Thida
 Thuta (child actor)
 Aung Khant Paing (child actor)

Awards

References

External links

2019 films
2010s Burmese-language films
Burmese horror films
Films shot in Myanmar
2019 horror films